Williams-Sonoma, Inc. is an American publicly traded consumer retail company that sells kitchenware and home furnishings. It is headquartered in San Francisco, California, United States. The company has 625 brick and mortar stores and distributes to more than 60 countries, with brands including Williams Sonoma, Williams Sonoma Home, Pottery Barn, Pottery Barn Kids, PBteen, West Elm, Mark and Graham, and Rejuvenation. Williams-Sonoma, Inc. also operates through eight corresponding websites and a gift registry.

The company is one of the largest e-commerce retailers in the U.S., and one of the biggest multi-channel specialty retailers in the world. In 2019, Williams-Sonoma, Inc. was named as a Fortune 500 company for the first time in its history.

History

Williams-Sonoma, Inc. had its initial public offering in July 1983. One million shares were offered on the OTC Market at $23 a share. At the end of 1985, the company was generating over $51 million in sales. In September 1986, Williams-Sonoma, Inc. acquired Pottery Barn from Gap. The acquisition included Pottery Barn's 27 housewares stores located in California, Connecticut, New Jersey, and New York for $6 million. The company's expansion led to the opening of its first distribution center in Memphis, Tennessee, in 1984. Williams-Sonoma, Inc. was one of the largest proprietary distributors in the Memphis area with 3.5 million square feet of distribution space.

From 1986 to 1989, Williams-Sonoma, Inc. grew by an average of 12 stores per year, bringing the total locations to over 100 stores in the U.S. It was listed on the New York Stock Exchange starting in 1998, while sales reached $1 billion for the first time.

The following year, Williams-Sonoma, Inc. launched its e-commerce websites. The company also launched Pottery Barn Kids, a spin-off of Pottery Barn that specializes in home furnishings for children.

The Pottery Barn brand further expanded with the launch of PBteen in early 2003. Pottery Barn extended its merchandising with the introduction of the Pottery Barn Bed & Bath and Pottery Barn Kids in Manhattan.

By 2009, Williams-Sonoma, Inc. was operating 610 stores with an annual revenue of over $3 billion. In May 2010, Lester retired, and Laura Alber was named CEO of the umbrella organization. Alber joined the company in 1995. She was active in building the Pottery Barn catalog and the development and launch of Pottery Barn Kids and PBteen. In November 2011, the company acquired Portland, Oregon-based Rejuvenation, a manufacturer and direct marketer of light fixtures and hardware with stores in Portland, Seattle, and Los Angeles. The company launched a lifestyle brand offering personalized products, Mark and Graham, in November 2012.

Williams Sonoma's e-commerce sales were approximately 52 percent of its parent company's revenue of the first quarter of 2015.

The West Elm brand was launched in 2002 with the release of a catalog; the following year, the brand opened its first store. Through the West Elm brand, the company launched West Elm Hotels. The joint venture  with DDK hospitality management and development company has locations in Detroit, Michigan, Indianapolis, Indiana, Minneapolis, Minnesota, Oakland, California and Savannah, Georgia.

The West Elm brand is active with the Clinton Global Initiative and in 2013 agreed to invest $35 million on hand made goods from U.S. and abroad to sell in its stores over the course of two years. The collaborations were aimed to positively impact over 4,000 artisan workers. Former President Bill Clinton visited a West Elm showroom after the company spent nearly that amount in the first year of the agreement. In 2015, the company made a pledge at the Clinton Global Initiative Annual Meeting to expand its Fair Trade Certified product offerings.

International presence
In October 2001, the company opened its first international stores in Toronto, Ontario, Canada. The Williams-Sonoma and Pottery Barn stores in Yorkville occupied a combined 37,000 square feet of space at the retail podium of the 100 Bloor Street West condominium; these stores closed in 2017 after the landlord substantially raised rents in 2014.

In 2008, the company opened Pottery Barn and West Elm stores at Plaza Las Americas in Hato Rey, Puerto Rico, a district of the capital San Juan.

In 2010, Williams-Sonoma, Inc. partnered with M.H. Alshaya Co. to launch Pottery Barn and Pottery Barn Kids franchise operations in the Middle East. The first Williams-Sonoma brand store outside of North America opened in Kuwait in 2012, along with West Elm at The Avenues Mall, the largest shopping center in Kuwait. The company also opened four stores (Williams-Sonoma, Pottery Barn, Pottery Barn Kids, and West Elm) in Australia as the first retail locations outside of North America owned and operated by Williams-Sonoma, Inc.

The company opened its first store in the United Kingdom in 2014 with the launch of its West Elm location in London. Williams-Sonoma, Inc. signed a franchise agreement in 2014 to begin opening stores and operating its e-commerce sites for six of its brands in Mexico. In the same year, the company also opened Pottery Barn and Pottery Barn Kids stores with a franchise partner in the Philippines.

Brands
Under the umbrella organization of Williams-Sonoma, Inc., the company's brands are:
Williams Sonoma – upscale products for the kitchen and home
Williams Sonoma Home – upscale home furnishings
Pottery Barn – home furnishings
Pottery Barn Kids – home furnishings for children
PBteen – home furnishings for young adults
West Elm – modern furniture and home decor
Rejuvenation – light fixtures, hardware and home furnishings
Mark and Graham – monogrammed gifts and accessories

"Made in USA" settlement 
In March 2020, the Federal Trade Commission (FTC) announced a settlement with Williams-Sonoma, Inc. over false advertising claims where Goldtouch Bakeware products, Rejuvenation-branded products, and Pottery Barn Teen and Pottery Barn Kids-branded upholstered furniture products were falsely advertised as being made in the USA. As part of the settlement with the FTC, Williams-Sonoma, Inc. agreed to stop making false, misleading or unsubstantiated "Made in USA" claims and is required to pay $1 million to the FTC.

See also

Charles E. Williams 
W. Howard Lester

References

External links
 Official website

Companies listed on the New York Stock Exchange
Companies based in San Francisco
1956 establishments in California

American companies established in 1956
1980s initial public offerings
Retail companies based in California
Furniture retailers of the United States